Gowd Mahi (also Romanized as Gowd Māhī) is a village in Gavkan Rural District, in the Central District of Rigan County, Kerman Province, Iran. At the 2006 census, its population was 123, in 25 families.

References 

Populated places in Rigan County